Moscow City Duma District 9 is one of 45 constituencies in Moscow City Duma. The constituency has covered parts of Northern Moscow since 2014. From 1993-2005 District 9 was based in North-Eastern Moscow; from 2005-2014 the constituency was based in South-Eastern Moscow (it actually overlapped the entirety of State Duma Lyublino constituency in 2005-2009).

Members elected

Election results

2001

|-
! colspan=2 style="background-color:#E9E9E9;text-align:left;vertical-align:top;" |Candidate
! style="background-color:#E9E9E9;text-align:left;vertical-align:top;" |Party
! style="background-color:#E9E9E9;text-align:right;" |Votes
! style="background-color:#E9E9E9;text-align:right;" |%
|-
|style="background-color:"|
|align=left|Tatyana Portnova
|align=left|Independent
|
|38.93%
|-
|style="background-color:"|
|align=left|Sergey Medvedev
|align=left|Independent
|
|20.99%
|-
|style="background-color:"|
|align=left|Ilya Sofronov
|align=left|Communist Party
|
|9.01%
|-
|style="background-color:"|
|align=left|irina Zasedateleva
|align=left|Independent
|
|8.38%
|-
|style="background-color:"|
|align=left|Lyubov Adamskaya
|align=left|Independent
|
|6.52%
|-
|style="background-color:"|
|align=left|Sergey Lebedev
|align=left|Independent
|
|2.23%
|-
|style="background-color:#000000"|
|colspan=2 |against all
|
|11.04%
|-
| colspan="5" style="background-color:#E9E9E9;"|
|- style="font-weight:bold"
| colspan="3" style="text-align:left;" | Total
| 
| 100%
|-
| colspan="5" style="background-color:#E9E9E9;"|
|- style="font-weight:bold"
| colspan="4" |Source:
|
|}

2005

|-
! colspan=2 style="background-color:#E9E9E9;text-align:left;vertical-align:top;" |Candidate
! style="background-color:#E9E9E9;text-align:left;vertical-align:top;" |Party
! style="background-color:#E9E9E9;text-align:right;" |Votes
! style="background-color:#E9E9E9;text-align:right;" |%
|-
|style="background-color:"|
|align=left|Sergey Turta (incumbent)
|align=left|United Russia
|
|57.61%
|-
|style="background-color:"|
|align=left|Valery Smirnov
|align=left|Rodina
|
|12.51%
|-
|style="background-color:"|
|align=left|Aleksandr Kulikov
|align=left|Communist Party
|
|11.34%
|-
|style="background-color:"|
|align=left|Yelena Kiriyenko
|align=left|Independent
|
|8.20%
|-
|style="background-color:"|
|align=left|Maksim Tretyukhin
|align=left|Liberal Democratic Party
|
|5.17%
|-
| colspan="5" style="background-color:#E9E9E9;"|
|- style="font-weight:bold"
| colspan="3" style="text-align:left;" | Total
| 
| 100%
|-
| colspan="5" style="background-color:#E9E9E9;"|
|- style="font-weight:bold"
| colspan="4" |Source:
|
|}

2009

|-
! colspan=2 style="background-color:#E9E9E9;text-align:left;vertical-align:top;" |Candidate
! style="background-color:#E9E9E9;text-align:left;vertical-align:top;" |Party
! style="background-color:#E9E9E9;text-align:right;" |Votes
! style="background-color:#E9E9E9;text-align:right;" |%
|-
|style="background-color:"|
|align=left|Sergey Turta (incumbent)
|align=left|United Russia
|
|75.80%
|-
|style="background-color:"|
|align=left|Sergey Shishkin
|align=left|A Just Russia
|
|13.44%
|-
|style="background-color:"|
|align=left|Aleksandr Shishkin
|align=left|Liberal Democratic Party
|
|7.57%
|-
| colspan="5" style="background-color:#E9E9E9;"|
|- style="font-weight:bold"
| colspan="3" style="text-align:left;" | Total
| 
| 100%
|-
| colspan="5" style="background-color:#E9E9E9;"|
|- style="font-weight:bold"
| colspan="4" |Source:
|
|}

2014

|-
! colspan=2 style="background-color:#E9E9E9;text-align:left;vertical-align:top;" |Candidate
! style="background-color:#E9E9E9;text-align:left;vertical-align:top;" |Party
! style="background-color:#E9E9E9;text-align:right;" |Votes
! style="background-color:#E9E9E9;text-align:right;" |%
|-
|style="background-color:"|
|align=left|Irina Ilyicheva
|align=left|United Russia
|
|34.41%
|-
|style="background-color:"|
|align=left|Yulia Galyamina
|align=left|Yabloko
|
|18.18%
|-
|style="background-color:"|
|align=left|Sergey Sidorov
|align=left|Communist Party
|
|17.37%
|-
|style="background-color:"|
|align=left|Alyona Popova
|align=left|Independent
|
|8.99%
|-
|style="background-color:"|
|align=left|Maya Galenkina
|align=left|Liberal Democratic Party
|
|4.68%
|-
|style="background-color:"|
|align=left|Aleksey Gusenkov
|align=left|The Greens
|
|4.63%
|-
|style="background-color:"|
|align=left|Vitaly Ponomaryov
|align=left|Independent
|
|4.51%
|-
|style="background-color:"|
|align=left|Olga Kuznetsova
|align=left|A Just Russia
|
|4.07%
|-
| colspan="5" style="background-color:#E9E9E9;"|
|- style="font-weight:bold"
| colspan="3" style="text-align:left;" | Total
| 
| 100%
|-
| colspan="5" style="background-color:#E9E9E9;"|
|- style="font-weight:bold"
| colspan="4" |Source:
|
|}

2019

|-
! colspan=2 style="background-color:#E9E9E9;text-align:left;vertical-align:top;" |Candidate
! style="background-color:#E9E9E9;text-align:left;vertical-align:top;" |Party
! style="background-color:#E9E9E9;text-align:right;" |Votes
! style="background-color:#E9E9E9;text-align:right;" |%
|-
|style="background-color:"|
|align=left|Andrey Medvedev
|align=left|Independent
|
|40.02%
|-
|style="background-color:"|
|align=left|Nikolay Stepanov
|align=left|Communist Party
|
|38.70%
|-
|style="background-color:"|
|align=left|Yekaterina Bakasheva
|align=left|Communists of Russia
|
|6.30%
|-
|style="background-color:"|
|align=left|Maya Galenkina
|align=left|Liberal Democratic Party
|
|6.16%
|-
|style="background-color:"|
|align=left|Alisa Goluyenko
|align=left|A Just Russia
|
|4.95%
|-
| colspan="5" style="background-color:#E9E9E9;"|
|- style="font-weight:bold"
| colspan="3" style="text-align:left;" | Total
| 
| 100%
|-
| colspan="5" style="background-color:#E9E9E9;"|
|- style="font-weight:bold"
| colspan="4" |Source:
|
|}

Notes

References

Moscow City Duma districts